In enzymology, a cis-3,4-dihydrophenanthrene-3,4-diol dehydrogenase is an enzyme that catalyzes the chemical reaction

(+)-cis-3,4-dihydrophenanthrene-3,4-diol + NAD+  phenanthrene-3,4-diol + NADH + H+

Thus, the two substrates of this enzyme are (+)-cis-3,4-dihydrophenanthrene-3,4-diol and NAD+, whereas its 3 products are phenanthrene-3,4-diol, NADH, and H+.

This enzyme belongs to the family of oxidoreductases, specifically those acting on the CH-CH group of donor with NAD+ or NADP+ as acceptor.  The systematic name of this enzyme class is (+)-cis-3,4-dihydrophenanthrene-3,4-diol:NAD+ 3,4-oxidoreductase. This enzyme participates in naphthalene and anthracene degradation.

References

 

EC 1.3.1
NADH-dependent enzymes
Enzymes of unknown structure